Olive Muriel Pink (17 March 1884 – 6 July 1975) was an Australian botanical illustrator, anthropologist, gardener, and activist for Aboriginal rights.

Pink spent much of her life agitating and being a passionate advocate for improved rights and conditions for Australia's Indigenous people. She never married, having lost a "very dear friend" Harold Southern, a fellow artist who was killed at Gallipoli in 1915. In her later years, Pink concentrated on botanical pursuits and established the currently named Olive Pink Botanic Garden in Alice Springs.

Early life

Pink was born in Hobart, Tasmania, the eldest child of Robert Stuart Pink and his wife Eveline Fanny Margaret (née Kerr). She received her education from Hobart Girls High School and later studied art at Hobart Technical School under artist and sculptor Benjamin Sheppard. In 1909 she joined as staff of the school.

Her father died in 1907, and in 1911 she moved with her mother and brother to Perth, Western Australia, and then in 1914 to Sydney, offering art lessons both privately and in private girls' schools. In May 1915, she joined the New South Wales Department of Public Works as a tracer having attained a town planning diploma the previous year. Sometime later she moved to the NSW Government Railways and Tramways where she designed various advertising posters. During this period, she developed her artistic skills further by attending classes at the Sydney Art School, one of the most influential art schools in Australia and run by Julian Ashton.

Central Australia
In 1926 she holidayed with well-known welfare worker and anthropologist Daisy Bates in remote Ooldea on the edge of the Nullarbor Plain, having her first encounter with Aboriginal culture. In 1930, Pink found herself retrenched from her government position and with her interest having been piqued by visits to the remote countryside, she travelled to Central Australia sketching desert flora.

She returned to Sydney and attended lectures in anthropology at the University of Sydney and became secretary to the Anthropological Society of New South Wales. Between 1933 and 1936 she received grants from the Australian National Research Council to work among the Arrernte people near Alice Springs and the Warlpiri people of the Tanami Desert. She published several papers on the Arrernte in 1933 and 1936, but, sensitive to cultural needs, refused to release her work on the Warlpiri. She also met Albert Namatjira during this period and purchased two of his early paintings. The two remained friends until his death in 1959.

At this time, Pink started agitating by writing endless letters to politicians and newspapers to raise the profile and awareness of difficulties faced by Aboriginal people. She strongly criticised government officials, missionaries and pastoralists, making uncompromising demands and constant badgering of politicians which resulted in her being investigated by ASIO as a communist sympathiser.

Pink lived with the remote people for several years, teaching English and other skills and including a failed attempt at establishing a "secular sanctuary" (or commune) for the Warlpiri people, before moving to Alice Springs to live in 1946. Suffering financial difficulties she lived in huts and a tent on the outskirts of the town living off the proceeds of her home grown fruit and flowers and exhibitions of her artwork as well as a job cleaning the local courthouse. During this period, she met with the artist Sidney Nolan and his wife, with whom she discussed her experiences with Aboriginal people.  She refused the old age pension and managed to live on an income of approximately £6.00 a week.

In 1955 she applied to the Northern Territory administrator for a reservation of about 20 hectares of land on the eastern bank of the Todd River as a flora reserve. The following year the grant was gazetted as the Australian Arid Regions Flora Reserve, with assistance from the Minister for the Territories, Sir Paul Hasluck. Pink was appointed as the honorary curator.

Hasluck had considerable correspondence with Pink over many years. In the Northern Territory Newsletter obituary in 1975 he told the following story:

At the Arid Zone reserve Miss Pink planted trees and, with the aid of her Aboriginal helper, watered them and tended them. Each tree bore the name of some prominent citizen and if that citizen fell out of favour with her she ceased to water it. So that if the leaves of 'Mr Archer' were drooping and the leaves of 'Mr Marsh' were bright and green or 'Mr Barclay' was growing vigorously one knew at once what had happened in the handling of her latest request. I visited her on several occasions and could never restrain a curious glance at my tree and felt suitably gratified if I saw that 'Mr Hasluck' was being watered regularly.

Death
Olive Pink lived in the reserve, assisted by her long-time companion and gardener, Johnny Jambijimba Yannarilyi, until her death, in Alice Springs, Northern Territory, at the age of 91. She died in Alice Springs Hospital and is buried in the Alice Springs Memorial Cemetery, within the Quaker section, a group with which she held close ties throughout her life and close to the Aboriginal section of the cemetery. Pink was also buried, according to her instructions, with her gravestone facing west (opposite to others buried there) in order to face the direction of Mount Gillen which she loved. After her death, the botanical garden she built was renamed the Olive Pink Botanic Garden and opened to the public in 1985. That garden was the inspiration for Anne Boyd's orchestral composition Olive Pink's Garden (2017). Boyd's 2022 opera, Olive Pink, was premiered in the garden.

A collection of Olive Pink's sketches, in pencil and crayon, is held in the University of Tasmania Library to whom she bequeathed most of her art collection. Several Namatjira paintings previously owned by her were bequeathed and are held at the Tasmanian Museum and Art Gallery.

See also 
 List of Australian botanical illustrators

References

Cited

Further reading

Olive Pink: Artist, Activist & Gardener: A Life in Flowers, Gillian Ward, 2018, Australia, Hardie Grant Books

External links
Olive Pink Botanic Garden website

1884 births
1975 deaths
20th-century Australian botanists
Botanical illustrators
Australian human rights activists
Women human rights activists
People from Hobart
People from Alice Springs
Australian Quakers
Australian anthropologists
Australian women anthropologists
20th-century Australian painters
Julian Ashton Art School alumni
20th-century Australian women scientists
20th-century anthropologists